Muhlenbergia andina,  known by the common name foxtail muhly, is a species of grass.

Distribution
It is native to western North America from British Columbia to California to Texas. It grows in moist habitat such as meadows, marshes, and riparian riverbanks.

Description
Muhlenbergia andina is a rhizomatous perennial grass growing 25 to 85 centimeters tall. The inflorescence is a narrow, dense cluster of appressed, upright branches bearing small, silky-haired spikelets.

External links
Jepson Manual Treatment
USDA Plants Profile
Grass Manual Treatment
Photo gallery

andina
Grasses of the United States
Grasses of Canada
Native grasses of California
Native grasses of Texas
Flora of the Northwestern United States
Flora of the Southwestern United States
Flora of the California desert regions
Flora of New Mexico
Flora of the Sierra Nevada (United States)
Natural history of the Mojave Desert
Flora without expected TNC conservation status